Rivne urban territorial hromada is a hromada (municipality) located in Western Ukraine's Rivne Oblast. The hromada's capital is the city of Rivne.

Settlements 
The Rivne urban hromada only consists of two settlements; its capital, Rivne, and the urban-type settlement of Kvasyliv.

History 
The Rivne urban hromada has adopted a strategy for the development of the hromada until 2027, including strengthening the role of residents in local government, expansion of small businesses, improvements to education, infrastructure, and healthcare, and development of the green and tourist economy.

In 2022, the Rivne urban hromada had the highest revenue from small business taxes among the hromadas of Rivne Oblast, bringing in ₴82.3 million.

References 

2020 establishments in Ukraine
Hromadas of Rivne Oblast